H320 can refer to:
H.320, a suite of video conferencing protocols
H.320 - America's Affordable Health Choices Act of 2009
IRiver H320, a member of the H300 series of media players
Brilliance H320, compact car produced by Brilliance Auto